This is a list of municipalities in Mexico which have standing links to local communities in other countries. In most cases, the association, especially when formalised by local government, is known as "town twinning" (usually in Europe) or "sister cities" (usually in the rest of the world).

A
Acámbaro

 Greenfield, United States
 Laredo, United States

Acapulco

 Beverly Hills, United States
 Cannes, France
 Cartagena, Colombia
 Eilat, Israel
 Onjuku, Japan
 Qingdao, China
 Sendai, Japan

Agua Prieta
 Douglas, United States

Aguascalientes

 Lampa, Peru
 Lynwood, United States
 Modesto, United States
 O Salnés, Spain
 Pharr, United States
 Temple, United States

Álamos
 Scottsdale, United States

Allende
 San Elizario, United States

Ángel Albino Corzo

 Ayutla, Guatemala
 La Blanca, Guatemala
 Catarina, Guatemala
 Coatepeque, Guatemala
 Malacatán, Guatemala
 Ocós, Guatemala

La Antigua
 Medellín, Spain

Atizapán de Zaragoza

 Sanford, United States
 Zaragoza, Spain

Ayotlán
 Storm Lake, United States

B
Benito Juárez

 Antigua Guatemala, Guatemala
 Granadilla de Abona, Spain
 Hangzhou, China
 Mar del Plata, Argentina
 Medellín, Colombia
 Mission, United States
 Naperville, United States
 Pharr, United States
 Punta del Este, Uruguay
 Sanya, China
 Wichita, United States

Boca del Río

 Tacoma, United States
 Tampa, United States
 West Valley City, United States

C
Caborca

 Prescott, United States
 Upland, United States

Cadereyta Jiménez
 McAllen, United States

Calkiní
 Colón, Cuba

Campeche

 Cartagena, Colombia
 Halifax, Canada
 Ibiza, Spain
 Laredo, United States
 Matanzas, Cuba
 Quetzaltenango, Guatemala
 Volusia County, United States

Cañadas de Obregón
 Superior, United States

Cananea

 Radebeul, Germany
 Sierra Vista, United States

Casas Grandes
 San Elizario, United States

Cedral

 Alton, United States
 Chicago Heights, United States

Celaya

 Durham, United States
 Rio Grande City, United States
 San Gabriel, United States
 Vigo, Spain

Centro
 San Bernardino, United States

Cerralvo

 Laredo, United States
 Roma, United States

Chapala
 Barrhead, Canada

Chiapa de Corzo

 Cuéllar, Spain
 Quetzaltenango, Guatemala
 Tejutla, Guatemala

Chihuahua

 Albuquerque, United States
 El Paso, United States
 Midland, United States
 Pueblo, United States

Chilpancingo de los Bravo
 McAllen, United States

Ciénega de Flores
 Laredo, United States

Cihuatlán
 Vigan, Philippines

Ciudad Juárez

 El Paso, United States
 Jerez de la Frontera, Spain
 San Elizario, United States

Ciudad Obregón
 Tucson, United States

Ciudad Valles

 Abangares, Costa Rica
 Corral, Chile
 Laredo, United States
 Pharr, United States

Ciudad Victoria
 McAllen, United States

Coatzacoalcos

 Rizhao, China
 San Fernando, Philippines
 Shandong, China

Colima

 Norman, United States
 Redwood City, United States
 San Fernando, United States

Comonfort
 Cleburne, United States

Córdoba

 Baton Rouge, United States
 Chillicothe, United States
 Córdoba, Argentina
 Córdoba, Spain

Cozumel

 Caravaca de la Cruz, Spain
 Miami Beach, United States

Cuautitlán Izcalli
 Diez de Octubre (Havana), Cuba

Cuautla, Jalisco
 Renton, United States

Cuautla, Morelos
 Riverside, United States

Cuernavaca

 Cavite City, Philippines
 Denver, United States
 General Villegas, Argentina
 Laredo, United States
 Minneapolis, United States
 Minoh, Japan

E
Ensenada

 Newport Beach, United States
 Redondo Beach, United States
 Riverside, United States

Erongarícuaro
 Jovellanos, Cuba

Ecatepec

 Guarulhos, Brazil
 San José, Costa Rica

Etzatlán
 Cienfuegos, Cuba

G
García
 McAllen, United States

General Escobedo
 Laredo, United States

General Terán
 Laredo, United States

Gómez Palacio
 South El Monte, United States

Guadalajara

 Alajuela, Costa Rica
 Albuquerque, United States
 Caracas, Venezuela
 Cebu City, Philippines
 Cigales, Spain
 Changwon, South Korea
 Curitiba, Brazil
 Daejeon, South Korea
 Downey, United States
 Guadalajara, Spain
 Guam, United States
 Kansas City, United States
 Kingston, Jamaica
 Kyoto, Japan
 Lansing, United States
 Laredo, United States
 Lima, Peru
 Malabo, Equatorial Guinea

 Natal, Brazil
 Oñati, Spain
 Panama City, Panama
 Portland, United States
 Saint Petersburg, Russia
 San Antonio, United States
 San José, Costa Rica
 San Jose, United States
 San Salvador, El Salvador
 Santo Domingo, Dominican Republic
 Seville, Spain
 Tegucigalpa, Honduras
 Tucson, United States
 Wrocław, Poland
 Xiamen, China

Guadalupe

 Edinburg, United States
 Laredo, United States
 McAllen, United States
 Reno, United States
 Woodstock, United States

Guanajuato

 Alcalá de Henares, Spain
 Alcázar de San Juan, Spain
 Ávila, Spain
 Arequipa, Peru
 Ashland, United States
 Avignon, France
 Cuenca, Ecuador
 Morgantown, United States
 Old Havana (Havana), Cuba
 Salinas, United States
 San Fernando de Henares, Spain
 Santa Fe, Spain
 South Bend, United States
 Toledo, Spain

Guaymas
 Mesa, United States

Guerrero
 San Elizario, United States

H
Hermosillo

 Irvine, United States
 Norwalk, United States
 Phoenix, United States

Los Herreras
 Laredo, United States

Hidalgo
 Goliad, United States

Hidalgo del Parral

 San Elizario, United States
 Santa Fe, United States

Huatabampo
 Gardena, United States

Huixquilucan

 Alajuela, Costa Rica
 Eshkol, Israel
 Longford, Ireland

I
Irapuato

 Chula Vista, United States
 Green Bay, United States
 Marianao (Havana), Cuba
 McAllen, United States
 Murcia, Spain

Isla Mujeres

 Almirante Brown, Argentina
 Bonita Springs, United States
 Chascomús, Argentina
 Florencio Varela, Argentina
 Helena, United States
 Lanús, Argentina
 Mar del Plata, Argentina
 Mission, United States
 Old Havana (Havana), Cuba
 Pensacola, United States
 Quilmes, Argentina
 San Juan, Argentina
 St. Petersburg, United States

Ixtapan de la Sal
 Guantánamo, Cuba

J
Jalostotitlán
 Livingston, United States

Janos
 San Elizario, United States

Jerez de García Salinas
 Laredo, United States

Jesús María
 Queen Creek, United States

Jiménez
 San Elizario, United States

Jocotepec

 Plymouth, United States
 Watsonville, United States

Juchitán de Zaragoza
 La Vall d'Uixó, Spain

L
Lagos de Moreno
 Brea, United States

Lampazos de Naranjo
 Laredo, United States

Lázaro Cárdenas
 Laredo, United States

León

 Bogotá, Colombia
 Cangas de Onís, Spain
 Havana, Cuba
 Irving, United States
 Laredo, United States
 Las Vegas, United States
 León, Nicaragua
 León, Spain
 Novo Hamburgo, Brazil
 San Diego, United States

Lerdo
 Las Cruces, United States

Lerma

 Lerma, Italy
 Lerma, Spain
 Rosario de Lerma, Argentina

M
El Mante
 Boulder, United States

Manzanillo

 Flagstaff, United States

 Saint Paul, United States
 San Pablo, United States
 Valparaíso, Chile

Marín
 Von Ormy, United States

Mazatlán

 Grande Prairie, Canada
 Hamm, Germany
 Pharr, United States
 Puntarenas, Costa Rica
 San Ysidro (San Diego), United States
 Santa Monica, United States
 Seattle, United States
 Tucson, United States

Mérida

 Camagüey, Cuba
 Chiquinquirá, Colombia
 Erie, United States

 Incheon, South Korea
 Manzanares, Colombia
 Mérida, Spain
 Mérida, Venezuela
 Miami, United States
 New Orleans, United States
 Panama City, United States
 Sarasota, United States

Metepec

 Antigua Guatemala, Guatemala
 Pharr, United States
 San Carlos, United States
 Trujillo, Peru
 Villanueva de la Cañada, Spain

Mexicali

 Nanjing, China
 Sacramento, United States
 San Bernardino, United States
 Taichung, Taiwan

Mexico City

 Beijing, China
 Berlin, Germany

 Cádiz, Spain
 Cerro (Havana), Cuba
 Chicago, United States
 Cusco, Peru
 Havana, Cuba
 Istanbul, Turkey
 Kyiv, Ukraine
 Kuwait City, Kuwait
 Los Angeles, United States
 Madrid, Spain
 Nagoya, Japan
 Quito, Ecuador
 Samarkand, Uzbekistan
 San Antonio de los Baños, Cuba
 San José, Costa Rica
 Seoul, South Korea
 Tegucigalpa, Honduras

Mexico City – Coyoacán

 Arlington County, United States
 Clifden, Ireland

Mexico City – Cuauhtémoc
 Seocho (Seoul), South Korea

Mexticacán
 Laredo, United States

Monclova
 Laredo, United States

Montemorelos
 Laredo, United States

Monterrey

 Barcelona, Spain
 Bethlehem, Palestine
 Bilbao, Spain
 Cape Town, South Africa
 Concepción, Chile
 Dallas, United States
 Guatemala City, Guatemala
 Hamilton, Canada
 Iași, Romania
 McAllen, United States
 Medellín, Colombia
 Monterrei, Spain
 Olongapo, Philippines
 Orlando, United States
 Rosario, Argentina
 San Antonio, United States
 San Salvador, El Salvador
 Shenyang, China
 Surabaya, Indonesia

Morelia

 Arequipa, Peru
 Caspueñas, Spain
 Fullerton, United States
 Gettysburg, United States
 Kansas City, United States
 Madrigal de las Altas Torres, Spain
 Matanzas, Cuba
 Monterey Park, United States
 Norwalk, United States
 Old Havana (Havana), Cuba
 Shreveport, United States
 Sopó, Colombia
 Valladolid, Spain

 Yakima, United States

Moroleón

 Esquipulas, Guatemala
 Kennett Square, United States

Mulegé
 Union City, United States

N
Nacozari de García
 Douglas, United States

Nahuatzen
 Martí, Cuba

Naucalpan de Juárez

 Anyang, South Korea
 Calgary, Canada
 Pittsburgh, United States
 Pozuelo de Alarcón, Spain

Nicolás Romero
 Belén, Costa Rica

Nogales
 Nogales, United States

Nuevo Casas Grandes
 Colorado Springs, United States

Nuevo Laredo
 Laredo, United States

Nuevo Parangaricutiro
 Pedro Betancourt, Cuba

O
Oaxaca de Juárez

 Antequera, Spain
 Antigua Guatemala, Guatemala
 Cartago, Costa Rica
 Havana, Cuba
 Luanda, Angola
 Mérida, Venezuela
 Palo Alto, United States
 Rueil-Malmaison, France
 Santa Cruz, Chile

Ocotlán

 Corona, United States
 Olathe, United States
 Oxnard, United States
 Stone Park, United States

Orizaba
 Portsmouth, United States

El Oro
 Santa Cruz, Costa Rica

Othón P. Blanco
 San Pedro, Belize

P
Pabellón de Arteaga
 Prairie View, United States

Palenque
 La Libertad, Guatemala

Papantla
 Laredo, United States

Paracho
 Cárdenas, Cuba

Parras
 Grapevine, United States

Pátzcuaro

 Madrigal de las Altas Torres, Spain
 Naperville, United States
 Sonoma, United States

Peribán
 Perico, Cuba

Piedras Negras
 Sandy, United States

Poncitlán
 Palmdale, United States

Puebla

 Antigua Guatemala, Guatemala
 Arequipa, Peru
 Burgo de Osma-Ciudad de Osma, Spain
 Cartagena, Colombia
 Cusco, Peru
 Fitero, Spain
 Florence, Italy
 Huntington Park, United States
 Łódź, Poland
 Managua, Nicaragua
 Oklahoma City, United States
 Pueblo, United States
 San José, Costa Rica
 Talavera de la Reina, Spain
 Wonsan, North Korea
 Wuxi, China

Puerto Morelos
 Medellín, Colombia

Puerto Peñasco

 Fremont, United States
 Ruidoso, United States
 Somerton, United States
 Tucson, United States

Puerto Vallarta

 Encino (Los Angeles), United States
 Gijón, Spain
 Highland Park, United States
 Mission, United States
 San José, Costa Rica
 Santa Barbara, United States
 Siófok, Hungary

Q
Querétaro

 Bakersfield, United States
 Holland, United States
 Orange, United States
 Shijiazhuang, China
 Yeosu, South Korea

Quiroga
 Mayagüez, Puerto Rico

R
Reynosa

 McAllen, United States
 Uberaba, Brazil

Rosarito Beach

 Glendale, United States
 Huntington Park, United States

S
Saltillo

 Alma, Canada
 Los Andes, Chile
 Auburn Hills, United States
 Austin, United States
 Fredericton, Canada
 Guatemala City, Guatemala
 Holguín, Cuba
 Itagüí, Colombia
 Lansing, United States
 San José, Costa Rica
 Windsor, Canada

San Cristóbal de las Casas

 Asheville, United States
 Ciudad Real, Spain
 La Libertad, Guatemala
 Quetzaltenango, Guatemala

San José Iturbide
 Pharr, United States

San Luis Potosí

 Almadén, Spain
 Idrija, Slovenia
 Manizales, Colombia
 McAllen, United States
 Pharr, United States
 Pico Rivera, United States
 St. Louis, United States
 Tulsa, United States

San Mateo Atenco
 El Porvenir, Peru

San Miguel de Allende

 Acquaviva delle Fonti, Italy

 Cuenca, Ecuador
 Las Heras, Argentina
 Laredo, United States
 Old Havana (Havana), Cuba
 Redlands, United States
 Santa Fe, Spain
 Santa Fe, United States
 Tyler, United States
 Ushuaia, Argentina
 West Palm Beach, United States

San Nicolás de los Garza

 Bello, Colombia
 Seguin, United States
 Taipei, Taiwan
 Winnipeg, Canada

San Pedro Garza García

 Plano, United States
 South Padre Island, United States

Santa Bárbara
 San Elizario, United States

Santa María Huatulco
 Quetzaltenango, Guatemala

Santiago

 Edinburg, United States
 Rio Bravo, United States
 Santiago de Cuba, Cuba

Satevó
 San Elizario, United States

T
Talpa de Allende
 Lynwood, United States

Tamazula de Gordiano
 Riverbank, United States

Tampico

 Houston, United States
 McAllen, United States

Tancitaro
 Pedro Betancourt, Cuba

Tangancícuaro

 Delano, United States
 Watsonville, United States

Tapachula

 Changzhou, China
 Dongying, China
 Quetzaltenango, Guatemala

Taretán
 Unión de Reyes, Cuba

Taxco de Alarcón

 Baguio, Philippines
 Baldwin Park, United States
 Canoga Park (Los Angeles), United States
 Cuenca, Spain
 McAllen, United States
 Zaruma, Ecuador

Tecámac
 Puyehue, Chile

Tecate
 Gilroy, United States

Tenango del Valle
 Huanchaco, Peru

Tepatitlán de Morelos

 Laredo, United States
 Madison, United States
 Ridgecrest, United States

Tepic
 Paramount, United States

Tequila

 Cathedral City, United States
 Chimbarongo, Chile
 Jelenia Góra, Poland
 Jerez de la Frontera, Spain
 Martel, France
 Padre Las Casas, Chile
 Pisco, Peru
 Yauco, Puerto Rico

Tijuana

 Baiyin, China
 Busan, South Korea
 Changchun, China
 Havana, Cuba
 Laredo, United States
 Panjin, China
 San Diego, United States

 Wuhan, China
 Zaragoza, Spain

Tingambato
 Limonar, Cuba

Tizapán El Alto
 Nampa, United States

Tlahualilo
 Laredo, United States

Tlalnepantla de Baz

 Ma'anshan, China
 Ourense, Spain
 La Serena, Chile
 Seville, Spain
 Wichita, United States

Tlaquepaque

 Antigua Guatemala, Guatemala
 Glendale, United States
 Springfield, United States

Tlaxcala de Xicohténcatl

 Medellín, Spain
 Munébrega, Spain
 Salé, Morocco

Toluca

 Da Nang, Vietnam
 Debrecen, Hungary
 Fort Worth, United States
 Nanchang, China
 Novi Sad, Serbia
 Ramallah and al-Bireh, Palestine
 Saitama, Japan
 Suwon, South Korea

Tonalá

 Brovary, Ukraine
 Laredo, United States

Torreón
 Laredo, United States

Tototlán
 Baldwin Park, United States

Tula de Allende
 Benicia, United States

Tulancingo de Bravo
 Pleasanton, United States

Tuxpan
 Niquero, Cuba

Tuxtla Gutiérrez
 Amarillo, United States

U
Uruapan

 Antigua Guatemala, Guatemala
 Casma, Peru
 Culver City, United States
 Kansas City, United States
 Madrigal de las Altas Torres, Spain
 Matanzas, Cuba

V
Valladolid
 Asheville, United States

Valle de Zaragoza
 San Elizario, United States

Veracruz

 Cádiz, Spain
 Callao, Peru
 Galveston, United States
 Havana, Cuba
 Laredo, United States
 Miami-Dade County, United States
 Mobile, United States
 Ordes, Spain
 Oviedo, Spain
 Pharr, United States
 Quetzaltenango, Guatemala
 San Jose, United States
 Santos, Brazil
 Seville, Spain
 Tampa, United States
 Valencia, Spain
 Valparaíso, Chile

Victoria de Durango

 Durango, Spain
 Durango, United States
 Franklin Park, United States
 Ningbo, China
 Sacaba, Bolivia
 Vigo, Spain

Villa del Carbón
 Mission, United States

Vista Hermosa
 Jalapa, Nicaragua

X
Xalapa

 Ambato, Ecuador
 Covina, United States
 Omaha, United States

Z
Zacatecas

 Azusa, United States
 Cuenca, Spain
 Eibar, Spain
 Huishan (Wuxi), China
 Jerez de la Frontera, Spain
 Lynwood, United States
 Málaga, Spain
 Oñati, Spain
 La Plata, Argentina
 Tolosa, Spain
 Woodstock, United States

Zapopan

 Antigua Guatemala, Guatemala
 Cartago, Costa Rica
 Changwon, South Korea
 Chengdu, China
 Częstochowa, Poland
 Grand Rapids, United States
 Jinan, China

 Marianao (Havana), Cuba
 Putuo (Shanghai), China
 Rosemead, United States
 Saginaw, United States
 San Pedro Sula, Honduras

Zapotlán el Grande

 Longmont, United States
 Redwood City, United States
 San Felipe, Chile

Zapotlanejo

 Chanco, Chile
 Racine, United States
 San Antonio de los Baños, Cuba

Zihuatanejo de Azueta

 Bensenville, United States
 Collingwood, Canada
 Los Gatos, United States
 McAllen, United States
 Palm Desert, United States

Ziracuaretiro
 Perico, Cuba

References

Mexico
Sister cities
Foreign relations of Mexico
Cities in Mexico
Populated places in Mexico